Francis Rimbert (born 3 October 1952 in Val d'Oise, France) is a French musician and composer.

Biography 

Francis Rimbert started playing classical piano when he was 5 years old. At the conservatory, he studied harmony, counterpoint, the fugue and orchestral leading. He won first prize in piano and moved onto Paris where he became a salesman, working in a music store which by chance imported synthesizers, at a time when nobody has sold such before.

He became interested in those electronic instruments and took the stage (Theatre des Champs Elysées – Paris) solo, surrounded by all his synthesizers (Bionic Orchestra, 1979).

Rimbert met another proponent of the synthesizer: Jean-Michel Jarre, through a mutual friend Michel Geiss, in 
1979 at Jarre's concert in Place de La Concorde, Paris. Since the 1986 Rendez-vous Houston concert, Rimbert has been at Jarre's side on stage.

Aside from his work on various albums for Jarre, Rimbert has created several works of sonic illustration and has won first prize at the international festival of electronic music 
in Tokyo in 1988 (chaired by Isao Tomita).

In 1994, Rimbert created music for some video games.

In 2003, Rimbert released a new album, entitled Double Face.  Gaelick is an homage to Michael Flatley (Lord of the Dance (musical)) and the lightness of the Irish dance.

In 2005, American distributor Atomic Quill Music signed a distribution contract and 10,000 units of Double Face were pressed. Rimbert performed a showcase during the Fuse-In festival in Detroit and held a release party at Record Time, a Detroit shop of electronic music. Various titles were remixed by American Djs, including Kenneth Thomas and 
D:Fuse and distributed by Moist Music.

During September 2005, Double Face was released in France and throughout Europe. In November, Rimbert held a showcase at Le Divan de Monde, in Paris.

In 2006, Francis signed distribution contracts in Scandinavia and with digital distributor Wild Palms Music. A single, Mecanique du Temps, a duet with his friend and hard rock guitarist Patrick Rondat, was released as a limited edition to coincide with a performance at Salon de la Musique in September. A compilation: Sound of Vintage Volume 1 followed.

March 2007 saw the release of Sound of Vintage Volume 2, followed by Snap Shots in October. During 2007, Rimbert and his band performed live concerts featuring some of the titles of this record. In these concerts he has shared the stage with LOL, and his friend Sylvain Durand. Also on board are a percussionist Victor Paillet, sound designer Nicolas Mills and singer Angy.

Invited by his distributors, first in Spain and then the Netherlands before taking on the rest of Europe, Francis pursued a promotional tour and performed a concert in Lyon in November 2007, to benefit Handicap International.

During 2008, Francis toured with Jean-Michel Jarre, performing the full Oxygene suite in several European cities. During 2009 and 2010, he has toured again, this time in the IN<>DOORS and 2010 tours of Jarre.

Live concerts 

 21 June 2007 in Suresnes, France - outdoor concert
 23 June 2007 in Croissy-sur-Seine, France  - outdoor concert (2500 people attended this live concert)
 A DVD of these two outdoor concerts was released from C.ZEN PROD on 14 February 2008 with the title: LIVE IN 2007.
 16 November 2007 in Lyon, France  - indoor charity concert for Handicap International. A DVD of this concert was released in 2008.

Discography 

Source: The Official Francis Rimbert Site

References

External links
Official website
Official blog
Spanish Official Website and webshop

1952 births
Ambient musicians
French composers
French male composers
French electronic musicians
20th-century French male pianists
French keyboardists
Living people
Lounge musicians
New-age synthesizer players
People from Val-d'Oise
Video game composers
21st-century French male pianists